This is My America is a young adult novel by Kim Johnson, published July 28, 2020 by Random House Children's Books, that explores injustices in the United States' justice system.

Reception 
This is My America received positive reviews from multiple entities, including starred reviews from Kirkus, who called the book "Harrowing and worthwhile; a call-to-action from the anti-racist insights of a generation of Black activists," as well as from Publishers Weekly, who claimed, "Activist Johnson's powerful debut is a timely testimony that echoes the social realities behind today's #BlackLivesMatter protests." Nic Stone said the book gives "[a]n incredible and searing examination of the often-tragic collision of racism and a flawed criminal justice system." Paste Magazine said the book "promises a powerful story about racial injustice." The School Library Journal called it a "strong debut" and Shelf Awareness named it "an incisive condemnation of the racist criminal justice system, mass incarceration and capital punishment. . . . A necessary add to all shelves, especially those focused on anti-racism and #BlackLivesMatter.” NPR named it Book of the Year.

The book also received the following accolades:

 Goodreads Choice Award for Young Adult Fiction Nominee (2020)
 American Library Association (ALA) Best Fiction for Young Adults (2021)
 ALA Amazing Audiobooks for Young Adults (2021)
 Rise: A Feminist Book Project List (2021)

References

See also 

American young adult novels
2020 American novels
Novels set in Texas
Random House books